is a Japanese professional baseball pitcher for the Tohoku Rakuten Golden Eagles of the Nippon Professional Baseball. He previously played for the Chiba Lotte Marines.

On December 19, 2018, he was sent to Tohoku Rakuten Golden Eagles as compensation from the earlier transferred for Manabu Mima.

References

External links

NBP

1993 births
Living people
Chiba Lotte Marines players
Auckland Tuatara players
Japanese expatriate baseball players in New Zealand
Nippon Professional Baseball pitchers
Baseball people from Osaka Prefecture
Tohoku Rakuten Golden Eagles players